Kreuth is a municipality and a village in the district of Miesbach in Bavaria in Germany.

Schloss Ringberg
During the days of Bavarian monarchy, the castle Ringberg was owned by the dukes of Bavaria. It was donated to the Max Planck Society in 1973.

Wildbad Kreuth
The springs were first mentioned in 1490. The first bath house was built in 1511 by Abbot Henry V. of Tegernsee. The buildings were used for political gatherings of the Christian Social Union of Bavaria for some decades. Today, it houses a simple hotel.

References

External links

Miesbach (district)
Spa towns in Germany